= Quaternary Geology and Geomorphology =

Textbook first published in 2009

- The cover of Quaternary Geology and Geomorphology in its original Chinese print
- Editors: TianMingZhong ChengJie
- Original title: 第四纪地质学与地貌学
- Language: Chinese
- Genre: teaching textbook
- Publisher: Geology Press
- Publication date: August 2009
- Publication place: China
- Media type: Print (Paperback)
- Pages: 310 (CN)
- ISBN: 978-7-116-06151-4

Quaternary Geology and Geomorphology(《第四纪地质学与地貌学》)is a teaching and researching textbook for higher teaching institutions in China. It was first published by Geology Press in August 2009, and the chief editors of the book are TianMingZhong, ChengJie, and so on.

Quaternary Geology and Geomorphology contains the most advanced knowledge about Quaternary geology until the final editing. It exhibits the internal connection along dynamic, geomorphology sediment and environment. Besides, the book systematically instructs quaternary geology and geomorphology. Authors also provided some popular research methods about quaternary geology.
